Hamilton High School or HHS is a public high school in Hamilton, Michigan. Hamilton's school colors are gold and black. Their athletic nickname is "the Hawkeyes."

History 
The Play A Bad Day at Gopher's Breath was first performed at Hamilton High School on November 14, 1972 and was directed by Al Ver Schure.

Curriculum

Hamilton Virtual School 
Hamilton Community Schools also offers a virtual learning option, and graduates have the option of earning a Hamilton Virtual diploma or a Hamilton High School diploma. Under the virtual learning option, students can complete most course work online, but some in-person attendance (such as for orientation and standardized testing) is required.

Extracurricular activities 
 Theatre: The high school offers one play in the fall/winter and a musical in the winter/spring.
 Athletics: Sports offered include cross country, football, golf, soccer, swimming, tennis, volleyball, basketball, competitive cheer, wrestling, baseball, softball, tennis and track.

Demographics 
Demographic breakdown of students is 93% White, 5% Hispanic or Latino, 1% Asian, and 2% two or more races.

Notable alumni 
 Kevin Haverdink, American football player

References

External links 
 

Public high schools in Michigan
Schools in Allegan County, Michigan